Samuel Shrewsbury Sr. House, also known as the Old Stone House, is a historic home located at Belle, Kanawha County, West Virginia.  It was built about 1810, and is a small single-pile sandstone building with a medium pitched gable roof. It is owned by the Belle Historical Restoration Society, Inc. and open as a historic house museum.

It was listed on the National Register of Historic Places in 1978.

References

External links
 Samuel Shrewsbury Old Stone House and Belle Heritage Park - information about the museum and the Belle Historical Restoration Society

Historic house museums in West Virginia
Houses completed in 1810
Houses on the National Register of Historic Places in West Virginia
Museums in Kanawha County, West Virginia
National Register of Historic Places in Kanawha County, West Virginia
Stone houses in West Virginia
Houses in Kanawha County, West Virginia